Andalo Valtellino (Lombard: Andel) is a comune (municipality) in the Province of Sondrio in the Italian region Lombardy, located about  northeast of Milan and about  west of Sondrio.

Andalo Valtellino borders the following municipalities: Delebio, Dubino, Mantello, Rogolo.

References

Cities and towns in Lombardy
Articles which contain graphical timelines